Otto Krombholz (also spelled Krompholz) (born 3 February 1899, date of death unknown) was a Czechoslovak footballer. He competed in the men's tournament at the 1924 Summer Olympics. At club level, Krompholz played for ethnic German club DFC Prag. He also won two caps for the Czechoslovakia national team.

References

External links
 

1899 births
Year of death missing
Czechoslovak footballers
Czechoslovakia international footballers
Olympic footballers of Czechoslovakia
Footballers at the 1924 Summer Olympics
People from Plzeň-North District
People from the Kingdom of Bohemia
Association football midfielders
German Bohemian people
DFC Prag players
Sportspeople from the Plzeň Region